Y98 may refer to:
 Y98 (radio)
 Grand Marais Airport FAA code
 Yttrium-98 (Y-98 or 98Y), an isotope of yttrium